Xanthophyllum impressum is a tree in the family Polygalaceae. The specific epithet  is from the Latin meaning "impressed", referring to the enclosed position of the axillary buds.

Description
The smooth bark is grey. The flowers are white, drying orange to dark red.

Distribution and habitat
Xanthophyllum impressum grows naturally in Borneo and the Philippines. Its habitat is lowland forests.

References

impressum
Trees of Borneo
Trees of the Philippines
Plants described in 1982